Vladimir Vujasinović (born 14 August 1973) is a Serbian professional water polo head coach and former player. He currently serves as head coach of VK Novi Beograd.

During his playing career, he won two Olympic bronze medals (FR Yugoslavia team at 2000 Olympics and Serbia team at 2008 Olympics), an Olympic silver medal (Serbia and Montenegro team at 2004 Olympics), and numerous other titles. He has been named best water polo player in the world several times. In 2003 he was pronounced the best athlete of Serbia and Montenegro, and in 2005 the Olympic Committee of Serbia and Montenegro declared him to be the best sportsman. Vujasinović has played 341 matches for his country and scored 391 times. In 2011, his then club VK Partizan won the National Championship and National Cup of Serbia, LEN Euroleague (his fourth overall), LEN Super Cup (his third overall), Eurointer League and Tom Hoad Cup.

Early life
Vujasinović was born on 14 August 1973 in Rijeka, SFR Yugoslavia (modern Croatia), to ethnic Serb parents hailing from Ivoševci village near Knin. He grew up in Istria.

Career

As player
Vujasinović debuted for the national team in Kotor scoring his first goal against France in an 18–3 win. He was 17 years, three months and 22 days old. From 1995. he was a permanent member of the national team, and a captain since 2003. During this period, Vladimir only missed the 1999 European championship after a doping scandal after the Italian Cup semi-final. In numerous surveys, he was elected as the world's best water polo player on the grounds that he can play equally well in all positions for the team. Forerunner of all-round player, he was a member of all possible ideal setups. He retired from the national team in 2008. Vujasinović is considered to be one of the best players in the history of world water polo. He played for Croatian Primorje, Serbian VK Crvena Zvezda, Spanish Barcelona, Italian A.S. Roma Pallanuoto, Serbian VK Partizan, Italian Pro Recco, Brazilian Fluminense. In summer 2007 he played with Maltese side Neptunes WPSC and helped them retain the Maltese First Division. He was named Most Valuable Player at the 2001 European Championship in Budapest, Hungary. Vujasinović won European Champions League several times with Italian Pro Recco (year 2007 and 2008) and Serbian VK Partizan. He rejoined Partizan Belgrade for the 2008/9 season. He won the Malta Waterpolo Summer League title with Neptunes Emirates (St. Julians, Malta) in August 2010.

As coach
Vladimir Vujasinović named as assistant coach of Serbian national team in 2012. With national team, he won 2016 Olympic Games, 2015 World Championship, two European Championships: 2014, 2016 and four World League: 2013, 2014, 2015, 2016. In 1 year and less than 2 months the Serbian National team had won the four biggest titles in Waterpolo in a row, a feat nobody before him did.

Club

As player

Neptunes WPSC
Efforts to strengthen the team and try to retain the championship in 2007 were made immediately after the 2006 season ended. Serbian idol Vlado Vujasinović was snapped up from top Italian side Pro Recco and Sergio Afric’s immediate reaction to the club president was "Abbiamo appena vinto il prossimo campionato!" And how true that was. Vlado turned out to be the toast of the game’s connoisseurs as he managed to bring the best out of his colleagues with his superb marshalling at the back, closing all gaps and his play-making was the platform of Neptunes offensive stints. The final game that wrapped up the championship for Neptunes will go down in the club’s history as the biggest win they ever registered over Sliema – 12–4.

Partizan Raiffeizen
2011–12 season

On 22 October 2011. Vujasinović scored two goals in the first round of the Euroleague Group, in an 8–9 loss to Szeged Beton VE. On 9 November Vujasinović scored a goal in the second round of the Euroleague Group in the 10–10 tie against TEVA-Vasas-UNIQA. On 26 November Vujasinović scored a goal in a 9–6 Euroleague third round win over ZF Eger in Belgrade. On 30 December Vujasinović won with Partizan the ninth "Tom Hoad Cup" in Perth, defeating in the final the Australian team, Fremantle Mariners 11–9. He led his rejuvenated team to the victory with no Serbia men's national water polo team representatives as a captain. On 15 February 2012. Vujasinović scored his first goal of the Serbian National Championship season, in the second round of the "A League", in an 8–6 win against Crvena Zvezda VET. On 17 February Vujasinović scored in the third round of the "A League", in an easy 14–2 win against ŽAK. On 26 February Vujasinović scored his last two goals in the final round of the Euroleague Group, in which his team lost by 9–8 to Szeged Beton VE and dropped out of the competition. On 1 March he scored two goals against VK Vojvodina in a 10–9 win in the "A League" fourth round.

Vujasinović has additionally had summer league club stints in Malta and Brazil with Neptunes WPSC and Fluminense, respectively.

As coach
Vujasinović led VK Partizan from 2013. He won two Serbian league matches and was twice in the semifinal in LEN Champions League.  He led the youngest team in LEN Champions League.

In 2016, Vujasinović signed a three-year contract with Italian Pro Recco, but stayed there for two seasons, until June 2018.

On July 1, 2019, he was named a new head coach of VK Novi Beograd.

Honours

Club
VK Crvena Zvezda
 National Championship of Yugoslavia (2) : 1991–92, 1992–93
CN Barcelona
 División de Honor de Waterpolo (3) : 1994–95, 1995–96, 1996–97
 Copa del Rey (2) : 1994–95, 1995–96
 LEN Cup (1) : 1994–95
AS Roma Pallanuoto
 Serie A1 (1) : 1998–99
Pro Recco
 Serie A1 (4) : 2001–02, 2005–06, 2006–07, 2007–08
 Coppa Italia (3) : 2005–06, 2006–07, 2007–08
 Trofeo del Giocatore (1) : 2003
 LEN Euroleague (3) : 2002–03, 2006–07, 2007–08
 LEN Supercup (2) : 2003–04, 2007–08
Neptunes WPSC
 National Championship of Malta (1) : 2007
PA Fluminense
 National Championship of Brazil (1) : 2009
VK Partizan
 National Championship of Serbia (4) : 2008–09, 2009–10, 2010–11, 2011–12
 National Cup of Serbia (4) : 2008–09, 2009–10, 2010–11, 2011–12
 LEN Euroleague (1) : 2010–11
 LEN Supercup (1) : 2011–12
 LEN Cup (1) : 1997–98
 Eurointer League (2) : 2009–10, 2010–11
 Tom Hoad Cup (1) : 2011

Individual
 European Championship MVP (1): 2001 Budapest
 FINA Athlete of the Year in men's water polo (1): 2001
 Golden Badge (1): 2003
 Best Sportsman by OCS (1): 2005

See also
 Serbia men's Olympic water polo team records and statistics
 Serbia and Montenegro men's Olympic water polo team records and statistics
 List of Olympic medalists in water polo (men)
 List of players who have appeared in multiple men's Olympic water polo tournaments
 List of men's Olympic water polo tournament top goalscorers
 List of world champions in men's water polo
 List of World Aquatics Championships medalists in water polo

References

 Waterpolo Serbia 
 Pro Recco

External links
 

1973 births
Living people
Serbs of Croatia
Sportspeople from Rijeka
Yugoslav male water polo players
Serbia and Montenegro male water polo players
Serbian male water polo players
Water polo centre backs
Water polo players at the 1996 Summer Olympics
Water polo players at the 2000 Summer Olympics
Water polo players at the 2004 Summer Olympics
Water polo players at the 2008 Summer Olympics
Medalists at the 2000 Summer Olympics
Medalists at the 2004 Summer Olympics
Medalists at the 2008 Summer Olympics
Olympic water polo players of Yugoslavia
Olympic water polo players of Serbia and Montenegro
Olympic bronze medalists for Federal Republic of Yugoslavia
Olympic silver medalists for Serbia and Montenegro
Olympic bronze medalists for Serbia in water polo
World Aquatics Championships medalists in water polo
European champions for Serbia and Montenegro
European champions for Serbia
Competitors at the 1997 Mediterranean Games
Competitors at the 2005 Mediterranean Games
Mediterranean Games medalists in water polo
Mediterranean Games gold medalists for Yugoslavia
Mediterranean Games bronze medalists for Serbia
Universiade medalists in water polo
Universiade gold medalists for Serbia and Montenegro
Serbian water polo coaches